Plastic Bank is a for-profit social enterprise founded and based in Vancouver, British Columbia, that builds recycling ecosystems in under-developed communities in an effort to fight both plastic pollution in oceans, as well as high poverty levels in developing countries. The company allows people living in poverty to collect plastic and trade it in for material goods such as school tuition, medical insurance, pharmaceutical access, internet access, and cooking fuel, with the aim of adding more benefits to their program in the future. Plastic Bank reprocesses collected plastics for reintroduction into the supply chain. They currently have operations in the Philippines, Indonesia, Brazil, and Egypt, with plans to expand into Colombia and Vietnam in the coming years

History 
Plastic Bank was started in 2013 by co-founders David Katz and Shaun Frankson. Their idea was to transform plastics into a form of currency for impoverished peoples. Katz initially came up with the idea for their model at an arcade, where people would trade in tickets for prizes. He took this idea to create a system in which that same kind of value would be applied to what people discard, effectively creating a currency, tradable for material goods or services.

 Late-2013: First pilot collection center in Lima, Peru
 March 2015: First full ecosystem launched in Haiti, following the success of the pilot program in Lima
 September 2016: App development begins in partnership with IBM
 November 2016: Expansion into the Philippines launched
 November 2017: Partnership with Henkel announced
 July 2018: Expansion into Indonesia launched
 November 2019: Plans for Egypt expansion with Henkel announced

Impact 
The company claims that this figure for plastic is equivalent to over 707,367,900 plastic water bottles, 1.5 million plastic coffee cup lids, and 500 million plastic straws

Plastic Bank has introduced collection bins into school environments to help students practice recycling early on. They also employ “Plastic Bank Ambassadors” to promote environmental education in Haiti

Awards 

 2019: Prix Voltaire International Award
 2019: Green Tech - Game Changer of the Year
 2019: SDG Action Award - Connector
 2018: Nature Inspiration Award
 2017: UN Momentum for Change Award (COP23)
 2015: Sustania Community Award (COP21)
 2014: EO Global Citizen Award
 2014: RCBC Environmental Award for Innovation

References 

Environmental organizations based in British Columbia
Organizations based in Vancouver